Love & Revelation is the fifteenth studio album by American duo Over the Rhine. It was released on March 15, 2019 under Great Speckled Dog Records.

Track listing

References

2019 albums
Over the Rhine (band) albums